Jayaram Pangi (born 16 August 1955) is an Indian politician of Biju Janata Dal. He was a member of the Indian Parliament, representing the Koraput (Lok Sabha constituency). On 9 May 2017 he left BJD and joined hands with Bharatiya Janta Party.

See also
 Koraput (Lok Sabha constituency)
 Indian general election in Orissa, 2009
 Biju Janata Dal
 Bharatiya Janta Party

References

1955 births
Living people
India MPs 2009–2014
People from Koraput district
Biju Janata Dal politicians
Lok Sabha members from Odisha
Bharatiya Janata Party politicians from Odisha